The  were submarines of the Imperial Japanese Navy during World War II.

They were one of the fastest submarine class built during World War II, second only to Walter Type XVII closed-cycle powered submarines. Twenty-three units were ordered from the Kure Naval Arsenal under the 1943 construction program. Due to the deteriorating war situation, only eight boats were laid down, and only three, numbered I-201, I-202 and I-203, were completed before the end of the war. None of them saw operational use.

Background
In 1938 the Imperial Japanese Navy constructed an experimental high-speed submarine for evaluation purposes, which was designated  for security purposes. The results gained from experiments with Number 71 formed the basis for the I-201 class submarines.

Design

By late 1942 it had become apparent to the IJN that conventional submarines were unable to survive the new ASW techniques coming into service, such as radar, HF/DF, sonar, and new depth charge projectors. New submarines were required, with a higher underwater than surface speed, quick-diving capability, quiet underwater running, and a high underwater operational radius.

The IJN General Staff made an official request for high-speed submarines in October 1943 and among the ships planned in 1944 to be constructed in 1945 were 23 "underwater high speed submarines" (Sen taka) temporarily designated "Ships No. 4501–4523".

The General Staff's final requirements were stated in Order No. 295 dated 29 October 1943 to the Navy Technical Department. Nevertheless, they were the fastest operational submarines of World War II, outpacing even the German Type XXI.

To meet the requirement for high underwater speed the designers had to:

Adopt a single-hull structure
Locate the main ballast tank higher than previous submarines to give a higher center of gravity and improve dynamic stability
Give the pressure hull and casing a highly streamlined form
Make the conning tower as small as possible
Replace fixed deck guns with retractable mounts housed in shuttered recesses when submerged. 
Use steel plates for the upper deck rather than wood
Install underwater charging system (snorkel)
Fit large horizontal control surfaces at the stern instead of the more usual bow-mounted dive planes; this improved directional stability and may have decreased turbulence-induced drag.
Reduce the crew and crew accommodation to provide battery space; the Sen-Taka was designed for a crew of 31, compared to that the similar-sized Sen-Chu (54), and the [[I-51-class submarine|Kai Dai 1]] (60) Types (in practice the SenTaka needed a crew of 50 when it became operational, leading to an unforeseen habitation problem).
Restrict the armament, also to save space; the Sen-Taka had the same torpedo outfit as the smaller Sen-Chu 2nd class submarine, and just half that of the comparable Kaidai 1st class submarine. Also the Sen-Taka had no deck gun, and the AA armament carried had to be held in retractable mounts, requiring hull space, in order to meet the streamlining requirement.

The I-201 class bore little resemblance to earlier I-boats, which were optimized for long range and high surfaced speed. By contrast, the I-201 emphasized submerged performance. It featured powerful electric motors, streamlined all-welded hulls, and a large capacity battery consisting of 4,192 cells. The I-201s, like other Japanese submarines of the period, were also equipped with a crude snorkel, allowing underwater diesel operation while recharging batteries.I-201 displaced 1,291 tons surfaced and 1,451 tons submerged. Armament consisted of four 53 cm (21 in) torpedo tubes and 10 Type 95 torpedoes. The two 25 mm anti-aircraft guns were housed in retractable mounts to maintain streamlining. The submarine was designed for mass production, with large sections prefabricated in factories and transported to the slip for final assembly.

Fate
Two submarines, I-201 and I-203, were seized and inspected by the US Navy at the end of the hostilities. They were part of a group of four captured submarines, including the giant  and I-401, which were sailed to Hawaii by US Navy technicians for further inspection.

On 26 March 1946, the US Navy decided to scuttle these captured Japanese submarines to prevent the technology from falling into the hands of the Soviet Union. On 5 April 1946, I-202 was scuttled in Japanese waters. The Hawaii Undersea Research Laboratory found the wreck of the I-201 near Hawaii using submersible craft in 2009.

Boats in class

Influences
The I-201 design and technology influenced Japanese Maritime Self Defense Force  (1959).

In fiction
A refurbished I-203 is used by the characters in the film Hell and High Water (1954).

See also
German Type XXI submarine
Ha-201-class submarine
Vessel Number 71

Notes

References

Stille, Mark. Imperial Japanese Navy Submarines 1941-45. Osprey, 2007., History of Pacific War Vol.17 I-Gō Submarines, Gakken (Japanese publishing company), January 1998, 
The Maru Special, Japanese Naval Vessels No.132, Japanese submarines I'', Ushio Shobō (Japanese publishing company), February 1988

External links
The Transpacific voyage of the I-400
Submarines of the Imperial Japanese Navy

Submarine classes
 
Submarines of the Imperial Japanese Navy